Climbing Hill is an unincorporated community in Woodbury County, Iowa, United States. Its elevation is 1,135 feet (346 m). The community is part of the Sioux City, IA–NE–SD Metropolitan Statistical Area. It has a post office with the ZIP code 51015.

Demographics

History
The community was named by C. E. Ostrander, the first settler and postmaster, whose home was on high ground and could not be reached except by climbing a hill. Climbing Hill is also known as home of the Hanckocks. The name was kept, though the community was moved several times and was finally located on level land circa 1867. Climbing Hill's population was 37 in 1902, and 83 in 1925.

References

Unincorporated communities in Woodbury County, Iowa
Unincorporated communities in Iowa
Sioux City metropolitan area
Populated places established in 1867